Fritz Pfleumer (20 March 1881 – 29 August 1945) was a German engineer who invented magnetic tape for recording sound.

Biography 
Fritz was born as the son of Robert and Minna, née Hünich. His father Robert (1848–1934) was born in Greiz, and his mother Minna (1846–1932) was born in Freiberg. Fritz had five siblings – Mimi, Hans, Hermann, Otto, and Mizi. Hans emigrated to the US.

Pfleumer developed a process for putting metal stripes on cigarette papers and reasoned that he could similarly coat a magnetic stripe to be used as an alternative to wire recording.

In 1927, after experimenting with various materials, Pfleumer used very thin paper that he coated with iron oxide powder using lacquer as glue. He received a patent in 1928.

On 1 December 1932 Pfleumer granted AEG the right to use his invention when building the world's first practical tape recorder, called Magnetophon K1. It was first demonstrated at the IFA in 1935.

References

External links 
 videopreservation.conservation-us.org – Museum of Historic Video Equipment – Beginnings of Magnetic Recording – Audio, 1920–30s
 A Critical History of Computer Graphics and Animation by Wayne Carlson, Ohio State University
 The History of Magnetic Recording by Steven Schoenherr, University of San Diego 2002 Retrieved 2011-12-17
 Fritz Pfleumer – German biography of Pfleumer from a local (Dresden) point of view 

1881 births
1945 deaths
20th-century German inventors